Jan Erik Tage "Janne" Schaffer (born 24 September 1945) is a Swedish songwriter and guitarist. He is best known for his work as a session guitarist for ABBA but he has also recorded with artists such as Bob Marley, Johnny Nash, Art Farmer and Tony Williams. He also played at the 1977 Montreux Jazz Festival.

His 1979 album Earmeal included session work from brothers Jeff, Steve and Mike Porcaro, as well as their father, Joe Porcaro. This is one of the few instances where the entire Porcaro family appears together on one album, the most well-known examples being Toto's Toto IV and The Seventh One.

Schaffer is a member of the Electric Banana Band where he plays guitar as the character 'Zebra'. He also performs with the group The Night Agent. Schaffer received the Albin Hagström Memorial Award in 1999 and in 2005 Illis quorum.

Discography – albums

1973 – Janne Schaffer
1974 – Janne Schaffer's Andra LP
1974 – The Chinese
1976 – Katharsis
1978 – Earmeal
1980 – 
1982 – 
1985 – Traffic
1987 – 
1988 – Electric Graffiti
1989 –  (with Leif Strand, Bo Westman and Nacka Sångensemble)
1989 –  (compilation) 
1990 –  (with Björn J:son Lindh and Gunnar Idenstam)
1992 – 
1993 –  (compilation)
1995 – 
1996 –  (compilation)
1996 –  (compilation)
2000 –  (music from the movie Hälsoresan with Björn J:son Lindh and Electric Banana Band)
2000 – 
2002 –  (compilation)
2002 –  (with Björn J:son Lindh, Leif Strand and Nacka Sångensemble)
2004 –  (compilation)
2005 –  (compilation)
2009 –  (compilation)
2010 – Music Story (compilation box)
2013 –  (with Lasse Åberg)
2023 –

Soundtracks
1970 – Förpassad
1974 – 
1979 – Repmånad eller Hur man gör pojkar av män
1998 –  (with Lasse Åberg)
1999 – Hälsoresan – En smal film av stor vikt (with Björn J:son Lindh)
2011 – The Stig-Helmer story (with Björn J:son Lindh)

Prog, fusion and jazz projects
 Svenska Löd AB: Hörselmat (1971)
 Gabor Szabo: Small World (1972)
 Gugge Hedrenius Big Blues Band: Blues of Sweden (1972)
 Anthony 'Reebop' Kwaku Bah: Anthony 'Reebop' Kwaku Bah (1973)
 Jazz Meeting 1. (1973)
 Rune Gustafsson: Killing Me Softly (1973)
 Pop Workshop: Vol. 1. (1973)
 Pop Workshop: Song of the Pterodactyl (1974)
 Gugge Hedrenius Big Blues Band: Blues of Stockholm (1974)                                                       
 Art Farmer: A Sleeping Bee (1974)
 Ablution: Ablution (1974)
 Rune Gustafsson: On A Clear Day (1976)
 Mads Vinding Group Featuring Janne Schaffer: Danish Design (1977)
 Various: Montreux Summit, Volume 1 (1977)
 Rune Gustafsson:  Move (1977)
 Gabor Szabo: Belsta River (1979)
 Allen Vizzutti: Rainbow  (1981)
 Oriental Wind: Bazaar (1981)
 Hector Bingert – Don Menza: El Encuentro (1983)
 Putte Wickman: Desire (1984)
 Urban Agnas: Bilder Från En Ö (1984)
 Putte Wickman: Mr Clarinet (1985)
 Lennart Åberg: Green Prints (1986)
 Leif Strand: 'New Age / De 12 Årstiderna' (1986)
 Andreas Vollenweider – Dancing with the Lion (1989)
 String Along With Basie: Rune Gustafsson Featuring Jan Schaffer, Georg Wadenius, Niels-Henning Ørsted Pedersen (1989)
 Isildurs Bane – The Voyage (A Trip To Elsewhere) (1992)
 Thomas Darelid – 10 Sånger Utan Sång (1992)
 Rune Gustafsson: Rune Gustafsson (1993)
 Isildurs Bane: Cheval – Volonté De Rocher (2002)
 Ola Melander Featuring Georg Wadenius, Janne Schaffer, Sofi Hellborg, Blue Marmelade Band: Blue Marmelade (2011)

Awards and honours
1989 – Swedish Grammy (Grammis) for "Instrumental production of the year" with the album Electric Graffiti
1999 – Albin Hagström Memorial Award
2005 – Illis Quorum
2010 – S:t Eriksmedaljen

References

External links
Janne Schaffer – Official website

20th-century guitarists
21st-century guitarists
Swedish guitarists
Male guitarists
Swedish film score composers
Male film score composers
1945 births
Living people
Singers from Stockholm
Swedish session musicians
20th-century Swedish male musicians
20th-century Swedish musicians
21st-century Swedish male singers
Recipients of the Illis quorum